Hiroshi Makino (born 17 February 1956) is a Japanese professional golfer.

Makino played on the Japan Golf Tour, winning four times.

Professional wins (9)

Japan Golf Tour wins (4)

Japan Golf Tour playoff record (1–3)

Other wins (4)
1986 Chiba Open
1987 Chiba Open
1988 Sapporo Beer Chiba Open
1994 Chiba Open

Senior wins (1)
Victory Golf Grand Masters

Team appearances
Four Tours World Championship (representing Japan): 1988, 1991
Dunhill Cup (representing Japan): 1992

External links

Hiroshi Makino at the PGA of Japan official site

Japanese male golfers
Japan Golf Tour golfers
Sportspeople from Tokyo
1956 births
Living people